Q10 or Q-10 may refer to:

Science and technology
 Q10 (temperature coefficient)
 Coenzyme Q10, a dietary supplement
 BlackBerry Q10, a smartphone

Transportation
 Q10 (New York City bus)
 MMIST CQ-10 Snowgoose, a U.S. Army cargo UAV
 LNER Class Q10, a class of British steam locomotives

Other uses
 Quran 10, Yūnus, 10th chapter

See also
 10Q, a quarterly financial report